Baheri is a town in the Darbhanga district, in the state of Bihar, India.

See also 
 Railway stations in India
 Antaur

References 

Villages in Darbhanga district